NCAA March Madness 06 is the 2005 installment in the NCAA March Madness series. Former North Carolina and former NBA player Raymond Felton is featured on the cover.

Soundtrack
The soundtrack uses college band versions of licensed songs. The songs used are "Waiting" by Not Forgotten, "Still Running" by Chevelle, "Because of You" by Nickelback, "Bundy" by Animal Alpha and "Paralyzer" by Finger Eleven.

Reception

The game received "generally favorable reviews" on both platforms according to the review aggregation website Metacritic.

See also
NBA Live 06

References

External links
 

2005 video games
Basketball video games
EA Sports games
NCAA video games
North America-exclusive video games
PlayStation 2 games
Video games developed in Canada
Xbox games